Çorum (Medieval Greek: Ευχάνεια, romanized: Euchaneia) is a northern Anatolian city in Turkey. Çorum is located inland in the central Black Sea Region of Turkey, and is approximately  from Ankara and  from Istanbul. It is the seat of Çorum Province and of Çorum District. Its population is 269,595 (2022).

Çorum is primarily known for its Phrygian and Hittite archaeological sites, its thermal springs, and its native roasted chick-pea snacks known nationally as leblebi.

History
There is ample archaeological evidence for human presence in the area since the  Paleolithic ages.
The area prospered during the Bronze Age,  with the emergence of the Hittite Empire between 1650-1200 BC. Hattusa, the Hittite capital,  was located in the region owing to its inherent geographic protection, and the well-established local economy as supported by the regional Karum system.

There is a hypothesis that the Byzantine town of Euchaneia was at or near the site of the modern city, but others place Euchaneia further east, at Euchaita.

The settlement of Çorum proper can be traced only to the 16th century. The name is of unknown origin, and is first attested in Ottoman records, in reference to a Seljuk fortress Çorum Kalesi described by Evliya Çelebi. In the mid 16th century, the fortress was divided into four mahalle or quarters. From 1867 until 1922, Çorum was part of Angora vilayet.

Çorum today

The town today is generally tidy and pleasant, with a locally popular countryside. As with most Central Anatolian and inland Black Sea towns, the population is largely conservative, leading to a generally more restricted nightlife that favors dry establishments, although there are some bars, pubs and cafés that offer a mix of contemporary and traditional Turkish folk music. Within the city, there is a good range of shops, cafés and restaurants, with a cuisine that includes a variety of pastries including the nationally-known Çorum Mantısı - a popular dish similar to ravioli that is slowly baked in a brick oven or steamed in a beef broth. As well as the archeological and other historic sites, the countryside surrounding Çorum offers many places for picnics, particularly near the Çomar reservoir or in the mountains around the province.

The old Ottoman houses, the 19th century clock tower, and the Çorum Museum that displays a range of artefacts from excavations in the region are popular tourist interests. An  International Hittite Congress of archaeologists is held in Çorum every three years.

Economy
Although the economic output of the city has historically been relatively small with a focus on traditional crafts like coppersmithing, tanning, hand weaving, agriculture and animal husbandry, over the past two decades, the city has shown a significant growth in industrial production and light engineering that has made it among the most industrially advanced cities compared to its population size.

Originally home to about 20 tile and brick manufactories and 10 flour and feed mills, the city today produces a wide variety of products ranging from cement to automobile parts, refined sugar to dairy products, textiles to computer parts, and more recently, poultry through chicken farming.

Population

Geography
Çorum is on the northern edge of the Central Anatolian Plateau. There is an attractive mountainous countryside around the city.

Climate
Çorum has a warm summer continental climate (Köppen climate classification: Dsb or Trewartha climate classification: Dcb) with dry summers and cold, snowy winters, and mild to cool wet springs and autumns with light rain.

Twin towns – sister cities

 Gimhae, South Gyeongsang, South Korea

Notable natives
 Mahmut Atalay - World champion and Olympic medalist wrestler
 Tevfik Kış - World champion and Olympic medalist wrestler
 Cevdet Cerit - professor of mathematics at Istanbul Technical University
 Komet or Gürkan Coşkun - Famous Turkish artist
 Soner Yalçın - Famous Turkish journalist, arrested for Ergenekon trials
 İbrahim Kaypakkaya - Founder of Türkiye Komünist Partisi/Marksist-Leninist
 İsmail Beşikçi - Writer
 Aşık Gülabi (Gülabi Gültekin) - Minstrel
 Gen. Ahmet Çörekçi - Former Head Commander of the Turkish Air Force
 Savaş Yurderi Kool Savas - a German rapper and hip hop artist

See also
 Anatolian Tigers
 Amasya
 Chickpea noghl
 Leblebi

References

External links

Pictures of the city with links to surrounding Hittite sites

 
Cities in Turkey
Çorum District
Populated places in Çorum Province